Therése O'Callaghan is a camogie player, captain of the winning National Camogie League team in 1991 and again in 1996. She also captained her club Glen Rovers to the All Ireland club championship of 1990.

Career
She won All Ireland medals in 1992, 1993 and 1995 and Gael Linn Cup inter-provincial medals with Munster in 1990 and 1992. She retired after playing in the last of her eight All Ireland finals with a heavily strapped Achilles tendon injury in 1996. After her retirement she served as Public Relations officer for the Camogie Association and on the advisory committee on the proposed merger between the Camogie Association and Gaelic Athletic Association.

References

External links
 Camogie.ie Official Camogie Association Website

Living people
Year of birth missing (living people)
Cork camogie players